The Grand Substitution() is a 1965 Hongkong movie based on the Huangmei Opera genre. it is based on The Orphan of Zhao.

Synopsis
A patriotic physician Cheng Ying was persuaded to serve the government by his sworn brother, Kung Sun. Emperor Ling was weak and could not control the corrupt minister Tu who seized an opportunity to rid himself of the loyal prime minister, Chao who had resigned in despair over the Emperor's inability to govern. Riding roughshod over the Emperor, Tu had an edict issued that ordered the entire Chao family put to death. The Prince Consort, a Chao scion, was thus ordered to commit suicide by the sword. Physician Cheng knew that Princess Chuang Chi was pregnant, promised to bring the baby away when it was born. He managed to sneak the baby out of the palace when the time came but the evil Tu, who had been waiting for the birth, initiated a hunt for the child. He ordered the next generation of the populace put to the sword unless the child was brought to him.

Cheng was caught in a dilemma for it meant his son who was born at the same time, was in peril. He also had to uphold his promise. With grief, he decided to substitute the last surviving member of the Chao family with his own son. Kung Sun proposed a plan to ensure the safety of Cheng and his wife along with the Chao orphan. Thus, another two innocent lives were added to Tu's bloodlist. A pleased Tu then put Cheng under his protection and adopted his baby son as his fosterling.

15 years later, another Emperor ascended the throne. A young Chao Wu met his mother by chance while hunting and was thrown out of the palace when she learnt whom his foster father was. Angered, he stormed off to Cheng to demand an explanation who then revealed to him his true identity and the family tragedy. The time was at hand for General Wu, a loyal official and a friend of the Chao family had returned with the army after 15 years at the borders. Tu was tricked into attending a supposed birthday party thrown by Cheng and was cornered by Wu's soldiers. Chao Wu and his mother took the opportunity to exact their revenge.

Awards
12th Asia-Pacific Film Festival(1965)
 Best Film
 The Most Versatile Talent - Ivy Ling Po

Huangmei Opera Vocals
 Ivy Ling Po - Chao Wu
 Liu Yun - Princess Chuang Chi
 Kiang Hung - Physician Cheng

Cast
 Princess Chuang Chi - Li Li-Hua
 Chao Wu - Ivy Ling Po
 Physician Cheng Ying - Yen Chun
 Madam Cheng - Chen Yen-yen
 Kung Sun - Yang Chih-ching
 Prime Minister Chao - Ching Miao
 Minister Tu - Li Ying

External links
 Wan gu liu fang 1965
 Wa gu liu fang imdb page

1965 films
Hong Kong historical drama films
1960s Mandarin-language films
Shaw Brothers Studio films
Chinese historical drama films
Huangmei opera films
The Orphan of Zhao
Films set in the Spring and Autumn period
Films set in Shanxi
Chinese musical drama films